"Karmacoma" is a song by British trip hop collective Massive Attack, released as a third and final single from their second album Protection on 20 March 1995. It contains rap vocals from band members 3D and Tricky. Tricky also recorded his own version of "Karmacoma", renamed "Overcome" for his debut studio album, Maxinquaye.

Massive Attack themselves recorded a second version of the song (without Tricky) renamed "Fake the Aroma" on The Help Album, a compilation album for the charity War Child. The music video for "Karmacoma" was directed by Jonathan Glazer, his first.

Samples
The main rhythmic structure of the track is a loop taken from Nusret Fateh Ali Khan qawali 'Dam mast qalender mast mast'. The melodic refrain (at 0:54) is taken from the opera Prince Igor by Russian composer Alexander Borodin, and also includes a sample of Tuvan throat singing used by The KLF in "Dream Time in Lake Jackson". The bass line sample featured on the Portishead remix is the same bass line used by Serge Gainsbourg in the song "Melody" from his 1971 album Histoire de Melody Nelson. The "Napoli Trip Mix" of the song by Italian band Almamegretta contains samples from Roberto Paci Dalò's record "Napoli", released in 1993. The Startled Insects wrote the music for this track (Tim Norfolk and Bob Locke).

"Overcome" 

Tricky remade "Karmacoma" for his 1995 debut album Maxinquaye under the title "Overcome", enlisting Martina Topley-Bird to sing his lyrics and incorporating a sample of Shakespears Sister's 1992 song "Moonchild". It was released as the third single from the album, a month before the album release. David Bennun from The Quietus later called his version "a thick, unquiet fever dream – and an almost cubist vision of a moment in time that encompasses within the same frame a couple walking through quiet suburbs as the Gulf War rages three thousand miles away". In an interview for Melody Maker, Tricky was asked about the sexual nature of the song and other material on Maxinquaye, to which he responded:

According to AllMusic critic Amy Hanson, the intensely "breathless and claustrophobic" song is still one of trip hop's best works: "Featuring Martina Topley-Bird's clear, otherworldly vocals, the song is constructed around a thrumming slow, low heartbeat bass beat and looped catch of breath that becomes earnest yearning – an act of foreplay which frames the lyrics, 'don't want to be on top of your list, and never been properly kissed.'" The song was featured on the soundtrack to the 1995 film Strange Days.

Track listing

"Karmacoma" 
 "Karmacoma" – 5:21
 "Karmacoma" (Bumper Ball Dub) – 6:01
 "Karmacoma" (The Napoli Trip Mix) – 6:10
 "Karmacoma" (Portishead Experience Mix) – 4:03
 "Karmacoma" (Ventom Dub Special) – 6:08
 "Karmacoma" (UNKLE Situation Mix) – 5:42

"Overcome" 
 "Overcome" (Album Mix) – 3:45 / 4:30
 "Overcome" (Bungle Mix) – 2:39
 "Abbaon Fat Tracks" – 5:53
 "Overcome" (Zippy Mix) – 2:39

 Even though the first track is listed as "Album Mix", it is 45 seconds shorter (on the CD single) than the version on the album Maxinquaye. Conversely, the third track is an extended version compared to the version on Maxinquaye.

References

External links
Watch the video on YouTube
Entry on mvdbase.com
MASSIVEATTACK.IE song info entry on Karmacoma

1995 singles
Massive Attack songs
Tricky (musician) songs
Music videos directed by Jonathan Glazer
1995 songs
Virgin Records singles
Songs written by Andrew Vowles
Songs written by Robert Del Naja
Songs written by Daddy G